Plainedge High School is an American public high school (and the only high school) in the hamlet of North Massapequa, Long Island, New York, and is part of the Plainedge Union Free School District.

Plainedge High School's football coach, Robert Shaver, was accused of running up the score in a game against South Side on 25 October 2019, which ended in a score of 61–13 in favor of Plainedge. As punishment, Shaver was suspended for one game, which resulted in widespread criticism from sports journalists, and an email to all on superintendent Edward Salina's mailing list in support of Shaver.

Notable alumni
 Ted Alflen – football player
 Manjul Bhargava – mathematician
 Edward Byrne – New York City police officer killed in the line of duty 
 Lori Carson – singer/songwriter
 Andy Glazer - poker pundit
 Steve Guttenberg – actor
 Jim Hodder – musician, drummer with Steely Dan (1972–1974)
 Hook - professional wrestler
 David Landsberg – actor/writer
 Dave Levisohn - Emmy award-winning TV Camerman
 Ruby Mazur - pop artist
 John Melendez – television writer and radio personality
 Dave Pokress - journalist photographer* Mike Rubendall – celebrity tattoo artist
 Tom Sabellico - author
 Howard Safir – former New York City police commissioner
 Duane Silverstein – international award-winning conservationist
 Richard C. Slutzky - High School Wrestling Hall of Fame
 Leonard Stegman - author

References

External links
 Official website

Oyster Bay (town), New York
Schools in Nassau County, New York
Public high schools in New York (state)